Mehdi Amirabadi (born 22 February 1979) is a retired Iranian footballer who usually played as a full back.

Early years
Amirabadi was born in Tehranpars, Tehran, Iran.

Club career
He joined Saipa in 1998. He joined Esteghlal F.C. in 2004. Since joining the club, he has again and again proven himself at the club scoring many vital goals as well as saving many. He has been the regular player since he joined Esteghlal on the right side for the team. In 2012, he was chosen as the club's captain after Farhad Majidi left the club on loan to Al-Gharafa. After spending 8 seasons at Esteghlal, by end of 2011–12 season he moved to Foolad along with Esmaeil Sharifat. He left Foolad in summer 2013 and joined Azadegan League side Paykan. He helped the club to promoted back to the Iran Pro League for the 2014–15 season.

Club career statistics
Last Update 10 May 2014

 Assist Goals

International career
He was part of the 2004 Asian Cup but did not play any match and never got a regular place for Team Melli.

Honours

Club
Esteghlal
Iran Pro League (2): 2005–06, 2008–09
Runner up (1): 2010–11
Hazfi Cup (2): 2007–08, 2011–12

External links
 Mehdi Amirabadi at TeamMelli.com
 

1979 births
Living people
People from Tehran
Saipa F.C. players
Keshavarz players
paykan F.C. players
foolad FC players
bahman players
Iranian footballers
Esteghlal F.C. players
Iran international footballers
2004 AFC Asian Cup players
Asian Games gold medalists for Iran
Asian Games medalists in football
Footballers at the 2002 Asian Games
Association football fullbacks
Medalists at the 2002 Asian Games
20th-century Iranian people
21st-century Iranian people